The Tehilla-Evelina de Rothschild Secondary School is a public Jewish religious secondary school for girls, located originally in the Old City of Jerusalem, Israel, but nowadays on Ussishkin Street. Founded in 1854 as the Evelina de Rothschild School, it was the first Jewish school for girls in Israel, and at the time had a Jewish Orthodox philosophy.

In 2007 it was reported that Orthodox Jewish girls schools, including the Evelina de Rothschild School, were facing falling enrolments due the demand for liberal Orthodox Jewish schools for girls. In 2011, the school merged with Tehilla Religious Girls' School, and the Jerusalem Municipality took a financial interest.

History 
The school was founded in 1854 in the Old City of Jerusalem by Dr Albert Cohen. The students learned domestic tasks such as sewing and knitting. Baron Lionel de Rothschild became the school's patron in 1867, naming it after his daughter Evelina who had died the previous year. The Anglo-Jewish Association took control of the school in 1962, out of a desire to influence the developing cultural character of Israel, although the baron continued to make a donation of £800 to the school every year. 

The school served a diverse population; there were both Ashkenazi and Sephardi students, as well as students who were Moroccan, Karaite, and Armenian Christian. The school was overseen by the nearby Rothschild Hospital, in the Old City of Jerusalem. In 1886, Dr. Yitzchak Schwartz, who oversaw the hospital, submitted the following report regarding the school:

Administration

When in 1888 the Rothschild Hospital moved into a larger building outside of the Old City, the Rothschilds appointed Fortunée Behar as the school's first headmistress. When Behar resigned in 1899, Annie Landau became the new headmistress of the school. She was awarded an MBE on the occasion of the King's birthday by Sir Herbert Samuel, British High Commissioner in 1924. Landau served as the headmistress from 1899 to 1945. When she died in 1945, vice principal Ethel Levy took over the position, leading the school through the tumultuous establishment of the State of Israel. Levy retired in 1960. Dr. Beverly Gribetz was awarded a Sylvan Adams Nefesh B’Nefesh Bonei Zion Prize in 2019 for her work as principal of the Evelina de Rothschild-Tehilla Secondary School.

References 

Women's rights in Israel
Schools in Jerusalem
High schools in Israel
Educational institutions established in 1854
Reform Judaism in Israel
1854 establishments in the Ottoman Empire